Elections to Cookstown District Council were held on 18 May 1977 on the same day as the other Northern Irish local government elections. The election used three district electoral areas to elect a total of 15 councillors.

Election results

Note: "Votes" are the first preference votes.

Districts summary

|- class="unsortable" align="centre"
!rowspan=2 align="left"|Ward
! % 
!Cllrs
! % 
!Cllrs
! %
!Cllrs
! %
!Cllrs
! % 
!Cllrs
!rowspan=2|TotalCllrs
|- class="unsortable" align="center"
!colspan=2 bgcolor="" | SDLP
!colspan=2 bgcolor="" | UUP
!colspan=2 bgcolor="" | UUUP
!colspan=2 bgcolor="" | DUP
!colspan=2 bgcolor="white"| Others
|-
|align="left"|Area A
|19.1
|1
|bgcolor="40BFF5"|22.8
|bgcolor="40BFF5"|1
|11.0
|1
|17.7
|1
|29.4
|1
|5
|-
|align="left"|Area B
|bgcolor="#99FF66"|35.3
|bgcolor="#99FF66"|2
|16.5
|1
|28.4
|2
|0.0
|0
|19.8
|1
|6
|-
|align="left"|Area C
|36.3
|2
|bgcolor="40BFF5"|52.4
|bgcolor="40BFF5"|2
|0.0
|0
|0.0
|0
|11.3
|0
|4
|- class="unsortable" class="sortbottom" style="background:#C9C9C9"
|align="left"| Total
|30.2
|5
|28.4
|4
|14.8
|3
|5.9
|1
|20.7
|2
|15
|-
|}

Districts results

Area A

1973: 2 x UUP, 1 x Republican Clubs, 1 x Loyalist Coalition, 1 x Independent Nationalist
1977: 1 x UUP, 1 x SDLP, 1 x DUP, 1 x UUUP, 1 x Independent Nationalist
1973-1977 Change: SDLP and DUP gain from UUP and Republican Clubs, Loyalist Coalition joins UUUP

Area B

1973: 3 x UUP, 2 x SDLP, 1 x Independent Nationalist
1977: 2 x SDLP, 2 x UUUP, 1 x UUP, 1 x Independent Republican
1973-1977 Change: UUUP (two seats) and Independent Republican gain from UUP (two seats) and Independent Nationalist

Area C

1973: 3 x UUP, 1 x SDLP
1977: 2 x UUP, 2 x SDLP
1973-1977 Change: SDLP gain from UUP

References

Cookstown District Council elections
Cookstown